Let No Man Write My Epitaph is a 1960 American crime drama film about the son of an executed criminal who aspires to escape his impoverished, crime-ridden neighborhood with the help of his mother and a group of concerned neighbors. The film was directed by Philip Leacock, and stars Burl Ives, Shelley Winters, James Darren, Jean Seberg, Ella Fitzgerald, and Ricardo Montalban.

The film was based on the 1958 novel of the same name by Willard Motley, and is a sequel to the 1949 film Knock on Any Door, which was itself based on an earlier Motley novel.

Plot
In 1950, Nick Romano, Jr., whose father was a convicted murderer and died in the electric chair (the story told in Knock on Any Door), lives in a Chicago tenement building with his mother Nellie Romano. Nellie supports herself and Nick by working as a barmaid, saving money in hopes that Nick will one day attend college and be a success in life. As a young boy, Nick befriends several of the neighborhood residents, including the alcoholic former Judge Sullivan, disabled newspaper vendor Wart, former prizefighter Goodbye George, lounge singer Flora, deliveryman/ taxi driver Max, and prostitute Fran. When Nellie is unfairly fired just before Christmas, the Romanos' friends all surprise her with Christmas decorations, food and gifts, and join in an impromptu party. Feeling a family connection to each other and young Nick, the group all agree to help Nellie look after the boy and protect him from falling into the life of crime prevalent in the neighborhood.

Ten years later, Nick is about to graduate high school. Through diligent practice, he has become a talented classical pianist who aspires to attend the local conservatory of music, but has been unsuccessful in getting an audition. His mother Nellie is now supporting them both by working as a B-girl and (it is implied) prostitute, causing Nick to suffer abuse from his classmates. Despite promising Nellie that he will not fight and risk injuring his hands, Nick fights several gang members who insulted her, and is saved from serious injury only when George, who has just been released from jail that day, joins the fight to help him. As a result, George is sent back to prison and Nick gets a jail sentence despite Judge Sullivan's drunken attempt to defend him in court. Nick is released when Nellie's new friend Louis Ramponi pays his fine.

Nellie has an affair with Ramponi even though she learns he is married and operating an illegal numbers racket. Judge Sullivan, who himself loves Nellie, learns via Fran and Flora, who has become a heroin addict, that Ramponi is also selling heroin. Ramponi soon gets Nellie secretly addicted to heroin. Sullivan decides he must do more to help Nick, and takes him to see Grant Holloway, a respectable lawyer and old friend of Sullivan. Holloway was also the public defender who unsuccessfully represented Nick's father, and now feels he owes a debt to Nick. After hearing the young man play the piano, Holloway agrees to help him get an audition for the conservatory. Nick begins dating Holloway's daughter, Barbara, and the two quickly fall in love. Nick is embarrassed when the Holloways visit him at home and see Nellie in what Nick thinks is a drunken state, but is actually heroin withdrawal.

On the day of Nick's conservatory audition, he learns that Nellie has become a heroin addict due to Ramponi. With a gun taken from Wart, Nick goes after the man, but Ramponi disarms him and holds him captive, planning to dose him with heroin. Alerted by Wart and Flora, Judge Sullivan, Max and Nellie go to Ramponi's business and rescue Nick. Ramponi shoots Sullivan, who in turn kills him by breaking his neck. Sullivan tells Nick to run away before the police arrive, and dies in Nellie's arms. Nellie and her friends mourn Sullivan's death and she declares she will "take the cure" and beat her addiction; the others, recognizing what a struggle life is for all them, are supportive but skeptical. Nick is happily reunited with Barbara and moves on to a better life.

Cast

 Shelley Winters as Nellie Romano
 James Darren as Nick Romano, Jr. 
 Burl Ives as Judge Bruce Mallory Sullivan
 Philip Ober as Grant Holloway 
 Jean Seberg as Barbara Holloway (Grant's daughter)
 Ricardo Montalban as Louie Ramponi
 Ella Fitzgerald as Flora
 Rudolph Acosta as Max
 Jeanne Cooper as Fran
 Bernie Hamilton as Goodbye George
 Walter Burke as Wart
 Francis De Sales as Night Court Magistrate
 Michael Davis as Nick Romano, Jr. as a child

Production
Film rights to the novel were bought by Columbia Pictures. A script was developed under the supervision of Charles Schnee who had an independent deal with Columbia since 1957. Schnee left Columbia in 1959.

Jean Seberg, who was under contract to Columbia, appeared in this film after Breathless (1960).

Music
Ella Fitzgerald, in her role as "Flora", performs several songs in the film, including "I Can't Give You Anything But Love, Baby", "Angel Eyes", and "Reach For Tomorrow". In connection with the film's release, Fitzgerald released the album Ella Fitzgerald Sings Songs from "Let No Man Write My Epitaph" containing the songs from the film along with other selections.

References

External links
 Let No Man Write My Epitaph at TCM
 Let No Man Write My Epitaph at IMDb
 
 

1960 films
1960 crime drama films
American black-and-white films
American crime drama films
1960s English-language films
Films scored by George Duning
Films based on American novels
Films directed by Philip Leacock
Films set in Chicago
Films shot in Chicago
Columbia Pictures films
1960s American films